Brock Lamb (born 22 January 1997) is an Australian former professional rugby league footballer who plays as a  and  for the Maitland Pickers in the Newcastle Rugby League. 

He previously played for the Newcastle Knights and the Sydney Roosters in the NRL, and for the London Broncos in the Betfred Super League.

Background
Lamb was born in Maitland, New South Wales, Australia.

He played his junior rugby league for the West Maitland Reddogs, before being signed by the Newcastle Knights.

Playing career

Early career
From 2014 to 2016, Lamb played for the Newcastle Knights' NYC team. In November and December 2014, he played for the Australian Schoolboys. On 21 January 2015, he signed a 3-year contract with the Knights until the end of the 2017 season.

2016
In round 9 of the 2016 NRL season, Lamb made his NRL debut for the Knights against the Sydney Roosters. In September, he extended his contract with the Knights from the end of 2017 to the end of 2018.
He finished his debut year making three appearances as Newcastle finished bottom of the table.

2017
Lamb played 21 games for the Knights during the 2017 season. On 9 July, during a close game against the Canterbury-Bankstown Bulldogs, Newcastle were given a penalty in the final seconds of the game with the score at 20-18 in favour of Canterbury. The first choice goal-kicker Trent Hodkinson handed the ball to Lamb to give his side the chance of sending the game into golden point extra time by kicking the goal. Lamb missed the conversion and Canterbury won the match, after the game Hodkinson was questioned as to why he gave the kick to level the game to Lamb. In the aftermath of the loss, Lamb was mocked on social media for his missed conversion attempt.

Lamb would go on to play 21 games for Newcastle as the club finished last and claimed the Wooden Spoon.

2018
After the additions of halfback Mitchell Pearce and five-eighth Connor Watson to the Knights' side in 2018, Lamb started the year coming off the interchange bench, before eventually being demoted to reserve grade. Lamb only played 8 NRL games for the season before parting ways with the Knights at the end of the year.

2019
Ahead of the 2019 season, Lamb joined the Sydney Roosters. Lamb started the 2019 season playing for the Sydney Roosters feeder club the North Sydney Bears.
On 31 March, Lamb kicked a winning 40 metre field goal for North Sydney against the Wentworthville Magpies in the Canterbury Cup NSW as Norths won the match 21-20.
On 6 May, Lamb was named in the Canterbury Cup NSW residents team to play against the Queensland residents side.

Lamb made his debut for the Sydney Roosters against his old club Newcastle in Round 11 as a replacement for Cooper Cronk. Newcastle would go on to win the match 38-12.

On 21 July, Lamb scored 2 tries and kicked 4 goals as North Sydney defeated the Blacktown Workers Sea Eagles 28-24 at North Sydney Oval in Round 18 of the Canterbury Cup NSW competition.

On 29 July, Lamb signed a deal with English Super League side the London Broncos until the end of the Super League XXIV season.
Lamb made a total of 6 appearances for the London Broncos as they were relegated from the Super League after finishing last on the table.

On 10 December, Lamb signed a two-year deal to join NRL side Parramatta.

2020 
On 16 January, Lamb left Parramatta without playing a game and returned to Maitland with the Maitland Pickers.

References

External links
London Broncos profile
Sydney Roosters profile
Newcastle Knights profile
SL profile

1997 births
Living people
Australian rugby league players
London Broncos players
Maitland Pickers players
Newcastle Knights players
North Sydney Bears NSW Cup players
Rugby league five-eighths
Rugby league halfbacks
Rugby league players from Maitland, New South Wales
Sydney Roosters players